Kirstin Irene Ferguson  is an author, columnist and company director, and creator of the #CelebratingWomen campaign. She is also a former Royal Australian Air Force officer. In September 2018, Ferguson was appointed by Prime Minister Scott Morrison as Acting Chairman of the ABC Board, after the sacking of Australian Broadcasting Corporation (ABC) Managing Director Michelle Guthrie and the subsequent resignation of the board's chairman, Justin Milne. When Ita Buttrose was appointed Chairman of the ABC in March 2019, Ferguson became the ABC's Deputy Chairman.

Early life
Ferguson was born in Melbourne. At the age of five, she moved to Sydney with her family. During her younger years she grew up in the Royal National Park, south of Sydney, living in the small town of Maianbar and attended Bundeena Primary School. For the first two years of high school, she was a boarding student at Hurlstone Agricultural High School before finishing her final four years of high school in 1990 at SCEGGS Darlinghurst.

Career
Ferguson enlisted in the Royal Australian Air Force in 1991, training as a cadet at the Australian Defence Force Academy (ADFA) from 1991 to 1994, also studying for a Bachelor of Arts degree for the cadetship's university component. Graduating as the dux of her ADFA class, she was posted to RAAF Base Amberley as a flying officer.

While serving in the RAAF, Ferguson studied for a law degree at Queensland University of Technology (QUT). She left the RAAF in 1998, joining the law firm Deacons (now known as Norton Rose Fulbright) as Director of Corporate Services. After eight years at Deacons, in 2006 Ferguson became CEO of Sentis, an international consultancy offering cognitive-based safety training in the mining and resources industry. In 2010, while Ferguson was CEO, Sentis was named by BRW Magazine as the 5th Best Place to Work in Australia.

While still CEO of Sentis, in 2008 Ferguson was offered a position on the board of directors for SunWater, which she accepted, and was then offered another board role. In 2011, she became a full-time board director, and since then has served on the boards of Dart Energy, she was the first female director of the Queensland Reds Rugby Union team, and she has also served on the boards of CIMIC Group, the Queensland Theatre Company and Layne Beachley's Aim For The Stars Foundation. She was Deputy Chairman of the Australian Broadcasting Corporation until the end of her five-year term in November 2020. Ferguson is also a board member of SCA Property Group, EML Payments and Hyne & Son Timber.

In 2022 Ferguson was appointed as a member of the Nomination Panel for ABC and SBS Board Appointments.

Ferguson is a Fellow of the Australian Institute of Company Directors (AICD) and a graduate of the AICD Company Directors Course and AICD International Company Directors Course.

#CelebratingWomen campaign
In 2017, Ferguson started the #CelebratingWomen hashtag and social media campaign in response to the denigration women face online. During the campaign she celebrated two women, from anywhere in the world and from all walks of life, each day of 2017 to encourage, as she put it, "more celebration and less denigration of women".

The #CelebratingWomen campaign saw Ferguson nominated for an Our Watch/Walkley Award for best use of social media. It has also led to many spin off campaigns around the world and in various industries.

Writing
In 2018, she co-wrote the book Women Kind with journalist Catherine Fox, which focuses on the collective shared power of women's networks and women supporting each other. The book was described by commentator and author Jamila Rizvi as "an impeccably researched love letter to those who hold up half the sky" and by Kate Jenkins, Australia's Sex Discrimination Commissioner, as "an essential and timely reminder of the collective power of women". Women Kind was named Management & HR Book of the Year in the 2019 Australian Business Book Awards.

Since 2021, Ferguson has written the weekly "Got A Minute?" advice column in The Sydney Morning Herald and The Age, where she answers reader questions on work, careers and leadership.

In 2023, Ferguson wrote Head & Heart: The Art of Modern Leadership (Penguin Random House).

Academic career
Ferguson studied a Bachelor of Arts degree and majored in History for which she received an Honours degree in 1994 from the University of New South Wales. Ferguson then completed a Bachelor of Laws degree with Honours from Queensland University of Technology in 2002. Ferguson completed a PhD through the School of Business at the Queensland University of Technology in 2015 and her thesis was called "A Study of Safety Leadership and Safety Governance for Board Members and Senior Executives". Ferguson's PhD saw her awarded a Colin Brain Governance Fellowship from QUT as well as the Dr Eric Wigglesworth Medal by the Safety Institute of Australia for the contribution of her research to the fields of corporate governance and workplace health and safety, respectively.

Ferguson has been an Adjunct Professor at the QUT School of Business since 2015. In 2020, Ferguson was named QUT Business School Alumnus of the Year. Ferguson was the only Australian named by Thinkers 50 in a list of 30 international leadership and management “thinkers to watch” for 2021.

Honours and awards
 1993 – Awarded Chief of Defence Force Air Force Prize as top graduating Air Force cadet at the Australian Defence Force Academy
 1998 – Received the Australian Defence Medal for her service in the Australian Defence Force
 2003 – Awarded Sir Winston Churchill Fellowship
 2014 – Named by the Australian Financial Review as one of Australia's 100 Women of Influence
 2018 – Queensland Award for Excellence in Women's Leadership by Women & Leadership Australia
2020 – QUT Business School Outstanding Alumni Award
 2021 – Only Australian to be named on Thinkers50 Radar List of top 30 international thinkers in management and leadership to watch 
 2023 – Member of the Order of Australia

References

Living people
Members of the Order of Australia
Royal Australian Air Force officers
21st-century Australian lawyers
Australian women lawyers
Australian women business executives
Graduates of the Australian Defence Force Academy
Queensland University of Technology alumni
Academic staff of Queensland University of Technology
University of New South Wales alumni
1973 births
People educated at Sydney Church of England Girls Grammar School